Cardel Benbow (born 3 June 1995) is a Jamaican international footballer who plays as a midfielder for Waterhouse.

Career

Club 

Benbow has played club football for Tampa Marauders and Waterhouse. In 2015, Benbow signed with Harrisburg City Islanders. In 2017, Benbow re-signed with Harrisburg on a two-year contract. After spending the 2017–2018 season with Waterhouse, in August 2018, Benbow transferred to Mount Pleasant Football Academy in the Red Stripe Premiere League.

International 
He made his international debut for Jamaica in 2014. In 2015 Benbow played for Jamaica u20s in the CONCACAF final round.

References

External links
Marauders profile

1995 births
Living people
Jamaican footballers
Jamaica youth international footballers
Jamaica international footballers
Association football midfielders
Tampa Marauders players
Waterhouse F.C. players
Penn FC players
Jamaican expatriate footballers
Jamaican expatriate sportspeople in the United States
Expatriate soccer players in the United States
USL Championship players
National Premier Soccer League players
2015 CONCACAF U-20 Championship players
Jamaica under-20 international footballers
Mount Pleasant Football Academy players